Chacophrys pierottii, the Chaco horned frog or lesser Chini frog, is a species of frog in the family Ceratophryidae. It is monotypic within the genus Chacophrys.
It is found in the Chaco of northern Argentina, eastern Bolivia, and western Paraguay. Its natural habitats are dry shrubland and gallery forest. Outside the breeding season adults remain buried underground but emerge during the first heavy rains to breed in temporary ponds.

It is threatened by habitat loss caused by agriculture and wood extraction. It is also collected for pet trade.

References

Ceratophryidae
Amphibians described in 1948
Amphibians of Argentina
Amphibians of Bolivia
Amphibians of Paraguay
Monotypic amphibian genera

Taxonomy articles created by Polbot